Anikó Kapros (born 11 November 1983) is a former professional tennis player from Hungary. She won the junior's singles title at the Australian Open in 2000.

Kapros caused an upset at the 2002 French Open, when she, as a qualifier, beat fifth seeded Justine Henin-Hardenne in the first round.

Career

Early life
Her mother, Anikó Kéry, won a bronze medal in gymnastics at the Olympic Games in Munich 1972. When Kapros was two years old, she moved to the Bahamas where her parents worked as acrobats. She returned to Hungary at the age of nine.

Professional career
In the 2002 French Open, as a qualifier, she upset future four-time French Open champion Justine Henin-Hardenne in the first round, 4–6, 6–1, 6–0. Kapros' senior career has been marred by recurring knee injuries. Her biggest success at a WTA tournament came in September 2003 when she reached the final of the Japan Open in Tokyo, where she lost to Maria Sharapova.
Her highest ranking in singles was world No. 44. Kapros was part of the Hungarian Olympics team in Athens in the year of 2004.

Retired in 2010 from professional tennis, she is now the head coach and club director at Patak Party Tenisz Club in Budapest. Kapros is also the co-founder (partnering with Ágnes Szavay and Zsófia Gubacsi) of "Happy Tennis" - a company offering a special tennis program for schools and kindergartens in Hungary.

WTA career finals

Singles: 1 (runner-up)

ITF Circuit finals

Singles: 7 (2–5)

Doubles: 4 (4–0)

Best Grand Slam results details

Singles

Doubles

External links
 
 
 

1983 births
Living people
Hungarian female tennis players
Olympic tennis players of Hungary
Tennis players at the 2004 Summer Olympics
Tennis players from Budapest
Grand Slam (tennis) champions in girls' singles
Grand Slam (tennis) champions in girls' doubles
Australian Open (tennis) junior champions